Problepsis mitis is a moth of the family Geometridae. It is found in Mauritius.

References

Moths described in 1932
Scopulini
Moths of Africa